Lipotropha is a genus of parasitic alveolates of the phylum Apicomplexa.

Species in this genus infect insects and myriapods.

Taxonomy 

This genus was created by David Keilin in 1923.

The type species is Lipotropha macrospora.

Description 

The schizogonic and sporogomic stages are intracellular.

The oocyst contains sixteen spores.

Each spore has eight sporozoites.

Host records 

Parasites in this genus infect Systenus species.

References 

Conoidasida
Apicomplexa genera
Parasites of arthropods
Parasites of Diptera